Spasatel Vasily Bekh (SB-739) was a Project 22870 rescue tug in the Russian Navy that was launched in 2016 and sunk during the 2022 Russian invasion of Ukraine.

Description 
Vasily Bekh was a rescue tug built to tow ships in distress, fight fires at sea, supply water and electricity to other ships, evacuate injured personnel, and act as a diving rescue platform. It had a crew of 26 and could carry an additional 36 people.

It had a standard displacement of 1200 tons and 1670 tons when fully loaded.

History 

Vasily Bekh was designed in Nizhny Novgorod by Vympel Design Bureau. The ship was laid down at Zvezdochka Shipyard in Astrakhan under the designation SB-739. It was launched on 2 August 2016, commissioned into the Russian Navy on 16 January 2017, and passed its trials later that month.

In March 2017, Vasily Bekh was one of four Project 22870 tugs assigned to the Black Sea Fleet, the others being Professor Nikolay Muru, Captain Guryev, and SB-742. It became part of the 145th Rescue Ship Detachment. The ship was given the name Spasatel Vasily Bekh on 19 April 2021, after the chief engineer of the rescue department of the Black Sea Fleet.

On 17 June 2022, Vasily Bekh was carrying personnel, weapons, and ammunition to resupply Russian-occupied Snake Island in the Black Sea. That day, the Ukrainian Ministry of Defense released a video of the attack on the ship taken by a Bayraktar TB2 combat drone. Vasily Bekh was struck by two anti-ship missiles in quick succession causing it to sink shortly thereafter. According to early unconfirmed reports from Russia, 23 of the 33 personnel on board were injured and the other 10 were missing. Shortly after the sinking on 21 June, British military intelligence confirmed the attack, stating that the vessel sunk was almost certainly Vasily Bekh, and that it was carrying a Tor anti-aircraft missile system when it sank.

References 

Auxiliary ships of the Russian Navy
Ships involved in the 2022 Russian invasion of Ukraine
Shipwrecks of the 2022 Russian invasion of Ukraine
2016 ships
Maritime incidents in 2022
Naval tugboats